The 2003–04 season was Aberdeen's 91st season in the top flight of Scottish football and their 93rd season overall. Aberdeen competed in the Scottish Premier League, Scottish League Cup, Scottish Cup.

Squad

Results

Scottish Premier League

Scottish League Cup

Scottish Cup

References

 AFC Heritage Trust

Aberdeen F.C. seasons
Aberdeen